The Journal of Immigrant and Minority Health is a bimonthly peer-reviewed medical journal covering research on immigrant health and the health of minority groups. It was established in 1999 as the Journal of Immigrant Health, obtaining its current name in 2006. It is published by Springer Science+Business Media and the editor-in-chief is Sana Loue (Case Western Reserve University School of Medicine). According to the Journal Citation Reports, the journal has a 2016 impact factor of 1.314.

References

External links

Public health journals
Publications established in 1999
Bimonthly journals
Springer Science+Business Media academic journals
English-language journals
General medical journals